Andrin Hunziker (born 21 February 2003) is a Swiss professional footballer who plays as a forward for Swiss Challenge League club Aarau, on loan from Basel.

Club career
Hunziker started his youth football by local club FC Therwil, but soon moved to the Basel youth academy and advanced through this regularly. He graduated to Basel's first team during their 2020–21 season under head coach Ciriaco Sforza. Hunziker played his domestic league  debut on 27 February 2021 in a 3–1 league defeat against St. Gallen as a substitute in the 70th minute. On 10 June 2021 Basel announced that Hunziker had signed his first professional contract with them and this was to run over four years until summer 2025.

On 26 July 2022 Basel announced that they would loan Hunziker out to Aarau for the coming season. Aarau confirmed the deal on the same day.

International career
Hunziker is a current Swiss youth international. He has played twice for the Swiss U20 team

Career statistics

Club

References

External links
 
 Player profile at sfl.ch
 Under-16 national team profile at football.ch
 Under-17 national team profile at football.ch
 Under-20 national team profile at football.ch

2003 births
Living people
Footballers from Basel
Association football forwards
Swiss men's footballers
Switzerland youth international footballers
Swiss Super League players
Swiss Challenge League players
FC Basel players
FC Aarau players